The 1800–01 United States House of Representatives elections were held on various dates in various states between April 29, 1800 and August 1, 1801. Each state set its own date for its elections to the House of Representatives before the first session of the 7th United States Congress convened on December 7, 1801. They were held at the same time as the 1800 presidential election, in which Vice President Thomas Jefferson, a Democratic Republican, defeated incumbent President John Adams, a Federalist. Elections were held for all 105 seats, representing 15 states.

These elections resulted in the Democratic-Republicans picking up 22 seats from the Federalists. This brought the Democratic-Republicans a solid majority of 68 seats, whereas the Federalists were only able to secure 38. Many state legislatures also changed to Democratic-Republican control, with the result that many new Democratic-Republicans were voted into the Senate. The Federalists never again succeeded in gaining a majority of seats in the House of Representatives, and  the national Federalist Party disintegrated completely in the early 1820s.

The victory of Jefferson and the Democratic-Republicans can be attributed partially to unpopular policies pursued by the Adams administration, including the Alien and Sedition Acts, which sought to curtail guarantees of freedom of speech and freedom of the press spelled out in the Bill of Rights.

The difference between Federalist policies in support of a strong national government and the Democratic-Republican preference for states' rights played a prominent role in the election.  Federal taxation became an issue as Southerners and Westerners rejected federal taxes levied on property.

Election summaries

Special elections 

There were special elections in 1800 and 1801 during the 6th United States Congress and 7th United States Congress.

Elections are sorted here by date then district.

6th Congress 

|-
| 
| John Marshall
|  | Federalist
| 1799
|  | Incumbent resigned June 7, 1800 to become U.S. Secretary of State.New member elected July 31, 1800.Democratic-Republican gain.Winner seated November 26, 1800.
| nowrap | 

|-
| 
| Jonathan Brace
|  | Federalist
| 1798 
|  | Incumbent resigned in May 1800.New member elected September 22, 1800.Federalist hold.Winner was also elected to the next term, see below.Winner seated November 17, 1800.
| nowrap | 

|-
| 
| Dwight Foster
|  | Federalist
| 1793
|  | Incumbent resigned June 7, 1800 when elected U.S. Senator.New member elected October 20, 1800.Democratic-Republican gain.Winner seated February 6, 1801.
| nowrap | 

|-
| 
| Samuel Sewall
|  | Federalist
| 1796 
|  | Incumbent resigned January 10, 1800.New member elected October 20, 1800.Federalist hold.Winner seated February 6, 1801.
| nowrap | 

|-
| 
| William Gordon
|  | Federalist
| 1796
|  | Incumbent resigned June 12, 1800 to become N.H. Attorney General.New member elected October 27, 1800.Federalist hold.Winner also elected to next term, see below.
| nowrap | 

|-
| 
| William Henry Harrison
|  | None
| 1799
|  | Incumbent resigned to become Governor of Indiana Territory.New member elected November 6, 1800 by the territorial legislature.Federalist gain.Successor seated November 24, 1800.Successor was not a candidate for the next term, see below.
| nowrap | 

|-
| 
| Samuel Lyman
|  | Federalist
| 1794
|  | Incumbent resigned November 6, 1800.New member elected December 15, 1800.Federalist hold.Winner seated February 2, 1801.
| nowrap | 

|-
| 
| Thomas Hartley
|  | Federalist
| 1788
|  | Incumbent died December 21, 1800.New member elected January 15, 1801.Democratic-Republican gain.Winner had already been elected to the next term, see below.Winner seated February 3, 1801.
| nowrap | 

|}

7th Congress

Connecticut 

Note: Between the two sources used, there is disagreement over the ordering of the candidates.  Both sources have the same numbers of votes recorded, but disagree on which candidates received those votes, one source lists Goddard as 8th, Talmadge as 9th, etc., as listed here, while the other has them as 11th, 12th, etc., three places off for all of them until the bottom three listed here which are moved up to 8th-10th, suggesting that one of the two sources accidentally misplaced three names on the list. They are ordered here as Goddard and Talmadge in 8th and 9th place as it is more likely that they'd been at the top of the runners-up given that they were subsequently elected to fill vacancies in the 7th Congress.

Delaware

Georgia

Kentucky

Maryland

Massachusetts 

Massachusetts law required a majority for election, which was not met in the 1st and 6th districts, necessitating a second trial.

Mississippi Territory 
See Non-voting delegates, below.

New Hampshire

New Jersey 

In 1800, New Jersey returned to its traditional at-large district, continued to use this system to select representatives until it was abolished in 1842, with a single exception in 1813.

New York

North Carolina

Northwest Territory 
See Non-voting delegates, below.

Pennsylvania

Rhode Island

Rhode Island switched to a general ticket for its two seats, instead of electing each one separately.  Only one candidate received a majority in the 1800 election, requiring an 1801 run-off election to choose a Representative for the second seat.

South Carolina

Tennessee 

Claiborne did not serve in the 7th Congress as he was appointed Governor of Mississippi Territory and was replaced in a special election by William Dickson (Democratic-Republican)

Vermont 

Vermont law required a candidate to win a majority to take office, necessitating a run-off election in the 2nd (Eastern) district.

Virginia

Non-voting delegates 

|-
! 
| colspan=3 | New seat
|  | New seat created.New delegate elected on an unknown date.Democratic-Republican gain.
| nowrap | 

|-
! 
| William Henry Harrison
|  | None
| 1799
|  | Incumbent resigned to become Governor of Indiana Territory.New member elected November 6, 1800 by the territorial legislature.Federalist gain.Successor seated November 24, 1800.Successor was not a candidate to finish the current next term, see above.
| nowrap | 

|}

See also
 1800 United States elections
 List of United States House of Representatives elections (1789–1822)
 1800–01 United States Senate elections
 1800 United States presidential election
 6th United States Congress
 7th United States Congress

Notes

References

Bibliography

External links
 Office of the Historian (Office of Art & Archives, Office of the Clerk, U.S. House of Representatives)